Lake Forest High School, or LFHS, is a public four-year high school located in Lake Forest, Illinois, a North Shore suburb of Chicago, Illinois, in the United States. It is the only school of Lake Forest Community High School District 115, which serves the communities of Lake Forest, Lake Bluff, Knollwood, and smaller parts of Mettawa and North Chicago. It is fed by Lake Bluff Middle School, Lake Forest Country Day School, Saint Mary's, and Deer Path Middle School.

History

The current LFHS was built in 1935. The most recent addition took place in 2008, and was responsible for the adding of a commons area, a new lunchroom and a music wing as well as other minor adjustments.

Campus

The high school has both a studio theater and auditorium, as well as a television studio with 5,500 videotapes. It also has computer labs, a computerized library with CD-ROM retrieval, student publication facilities, photography lab, and special education facilities. Sports facilities include a field house, climbing wall, swimming pool with a diving well and student gym.

The grounds include a large front lawn (used for field hockey, lacrosse, and ultimate) and a full-sized track and football field with 2 sets of bleachers. Because the school is situated very close to residential areas, the City of Lake Forest does not permit the school's football team to use floodlights, effectively prohibiting night games; however, in 2006, the city did allow the school to rent lights for a one-time night game. A 2007 referendum relocated the school's football facilities to the school's west campus, where the use of floodlights is not prohibited. The referendum passed by an overwhelming 2/3 majority, and renovations took place in two phases. The first phase, completed during the 2007/2008 school year, included the addition of a music wing, and renovation of the west campus including construction of a Varsity field. The second phase, completed in August 2008, included academic renovations at the east campus with a brand new dining room, a large atrium or "The Commons" and library, and construction of administrative offices at the west campus, additionally at West campus a new football field complete with floodlights and astro turf was built, now allowing night games. Prior to this, a first referendum was passed on November 7, 2006 unanimously by the Lake Forest High School Board of Education. This referendum was later passed on to the rest of the community and appropriated $54 million to be paid back over the next 20 years.

Academics
In 2005, Lake Forest graduated 98.9% of its senior class. It has been included in the "Top million" and "Most Successful" lists of the National Association of Secondary School Principals, The New York Times, The Washington Post, and Parade magazine. The average class size is 19.3. Lake Forest has made Adequate Yearly Progress on the Prairie State Achievements Examination, a state test part of the No Child Left Behind Act.

In 2010, Lake Forest had a mean ACT composite score of 26.5—one of the highest in the state. The national average was 21.1. SAT mean scores were 601 in Critical Reading; 621 in Math; and 594 in Writing.

The average tenure of faculty members is 11.3 years with 96% of the faculty holding a master's degree or higher. There are 156 certified staff members, creating a student to staff ratio of 12.7

Along with the typical course offerings, Lake Forest High School also covers 26 AP classes and 40 Honors classes. The Advanced Placement courses offered include: Biology, Calculus AB, Calculus BC, Chemistry, Computer Programming, Computer Science, Economics, Environmental Science, French V, French VI, German IV, Latin IV, Latin V, Literary Analysis and Criticism, Modern European History, Music Theory, Psychology, Physics C, Political Science, Spanish V, Statistics, Studio Art, United States History, and World History.

The Lake Forest High School Foundation was established in 2002 and adopted the mission statement of providing funding for resources necessary to support and enrich the educational experience of the students, faculty and staff of Lake Forest High School. This Foundation is there to provide Lake Forest High School's students and faculty with the funding they need to become more educated. The Lake Forest High School Foundation has given over 220 grants which totals to about $1,600,000.

Athletics

Lake Forest High School has won 71 state championships in athletics, 43 since 2000. In their 2010–2011 season, the Scouts won three state championships. The school's Varsity Dance Team (Pom Pons) won the 2013 and 2014 Large Varsity Pom National Champions at the National Dance Team Competition. The Girls Varsity Tennis Team has won two state titles in the past three years, and the Varsity Field Hockey was state champions in 2012. The Girls Ice Hockey team won the state titles in 2011 and 2013. The 2013/14 Girl's Varsity Soccer team also won a state title in penalty kicks. The Scouts receive substantial financial support from the LFHS Booster Club.

Notable alumni

 Alan Benes, 1990 — Major League Baseball pitcher, 1995–2003: St. Louis Cardinals, Chicago Cubs, and Texas Rangers
 Andrew Bird, 1991 — musician
 Mat Devine — lead singer of Kill Hannah
 Dave Eggers, 1988 — writer
 William D. Eggers, 1985 — writer and consultant
 Charlie Finn — actor
 Matt Grevers, 2003 — swimmer: four-time Olympic gold medalist at the 2008 and 2012 Summer Olympics
 Rob Pelinka, 1988 — general manager of NBA's Los Angeles Lakers
 Tommy Rees, 2010 — former American football player and current offensive coordinator at Notre Dame. 
 Phil Rosenthal, 1981 — columnist: Chicago Tribune
 Jenn Shapland, 2005 — writer and archivist
 Harry Shipp, 2010 — soccer player
 Jane Skinner, 1985 — television news presenter: Fox News Channel; Wife to NFL commissioner Roger Goodell
 Sarah Spain, 1998 — ESPN reporter 
 Brittany "McKey" Sullivan, 2007 — winner of America's Next Top Model, Cycle 11
 Vince Vaughn, 1988 — film actor
 Catherine Warren, 2002 — Miss Illinois USA 2006
 Tim Weigel, 1963 — sportscaster

Media references
The 1980 film Ordinary People is set in nearby Lake Bluff, and parts of the film were shot at the school; however all swim team scenes were filmed at nearby Lake Forest College.

An Episode of the MTV series "High School Stories" focuses on students who attended Lake Forest High School.

References

External links 
Official website

School buildings completed in 1935
Educational institutions established in 1935
Public high schools in Illinois
Lake Forest, Illinois
Schools in Lake County, Illinois
1935 establishments in Illinois